Big Brother Africa 7 (also known as Big Brother Africa: StarGame!) was the seventh season of the Big Brother Africa reality television series produced by Endemol for M-Net. It began on 6 May 2012, and ran for 91 days ending on 5 August 2012. Ikponmwosa "IK" Osakioduwa came back to host the show for the fourth time in a row. The first episode had live performances from American rapper J. Cole, Kenyan hip hop group Camp Mulla, Nigerian musicians P-Square, Naeto C, Flavour and Davido, and South African artist Aemo E'Face in the opening ceremony. On Thursday, 14 February 2013; Goldie died at the age of 29 after returning from the Grammy Awards. She is the first Big Brother Africa ex-housemate to die.

Format
There were thirty five housemates this season and lived in two houses. Upville and Downville. Seven of the thirty five were celebrity housemates who lived in the Upville House while the remaining twenty eight lived in the Downville House. The housemates were competing for US$300,000. This season also featured the Random Lottery Nomination where two countries from the Downville House will be nominated for the week and depending on the votes, the survivors will move to the Upville House while the rest are evicted. This year, fourteen countries participated in the season. Each country had two representatives paired up as Big Brother Friends plus seven celebrities from the fourteen African countries. Of the fourteen countries, twelve of them were returning countries while the other two were new ones. The twelve returning countries were Angola, Botswana, Ghana, Kenya, Malawi, Namibia, Nigeria, South Africa, Tanzania, Uganda, Zambia and Zimbabwe. The two new countries were Liberia and Sierra Leone.

Housemates
On Day 1, thirty five housemates entered the House on launch night including 7 celebrity contestants.

  Celebrity contestant.

Nominations table

 Legend:
 Red names indicate Upville housemates.
 Blue names indicate Downville housemates.

Nominations total received

 Legend:
 Red names indicate Upville housemates.
 Blue names indicate Downville housemates.
  Head of House of the week.
  No nominations for that house for the week.
  Nominated for the week.
  Immune from nominations for the week.

Voting history

  Survivor(s) of the vote.

Nominations and voting notes

Week 1
On Day 1, Tanzania and Zimbabwe were nominated via the Random Lottery Nomination, making Hilda, Julio, Maneta and Teclar up for eviction for the week.

This week, viewers voted for the housemate they wanted to save and these were the results:
Maneta received 8 votes to save: Botswana, Kenya, Malawi, Namibia, South Africa, Zambia, Zimbabwe and Rest of Africa.
Hilda received 6 votes to save: Ghana, Liberia, Nigeria, Sierra Leone, Tanzania and Uganda.
Julio received 1 vote to save: Angola.
Teclar received no votes to save.

On Day 7, Hilda, Julio and Teclar were evicted while Maneta moved to the Upville House.

Week 2
On Day 8, Liberia and Sierra Leone were nominated via the Random Lottery Nomination, making Dalphin, Luke, Yadel and Zainab up for eviction for the week.

On Day 12, Chris and Ola walked out of the house due to the latter's health problems.

This week, viewers voted for housemate they wanted to save and these were the results:
Zainab received 13 votes to save: Angola, Botswana, Ghana, Kenya, Malawi, Namibia, Nigeria, Sierra Leone, South Africa, Tanzania, Uganda, Zimbabwe and Rest of Africa.
Luke received 1 vote to save: Zambia.
Yadel received 1 vote to save: Liberia.
Dalphin received no votes to save.

On Day 14, Dalphin, Luke and Yadel were evicted while Zainab moved to the Upville House.

Week 3
On Day 15, nominations occurred in the Upville House. Zainab was exempted from the nominations after joining the house the previous day.

The initial nominees were DKB, Mampi and Maneta.Head of House, DKB decided to save himself and replace himself with Lady May.Therefore, Lady May, Mampi and Maneta were up for eviction for the week.

This week, viewers voted for the housemate they wanted to save and these were the results:
Lady May received 12 votes to save: Angola, Ghana, Kenya, Liberia, Malawi, Namibia, Nigeria, Sierra Leone, South Africa, Tanzania, Uganda and Rest of Africa.
Maneta received 2 votes to save: Botswana and Zimbabwe.
Mampi received 1 vote to save: Zambia.

On Day 21, Mampi was evicted.

Week 4
On Day 22, Botswana and Ghana were nominated via the Random Lottery Nomination, making Edith, Eve, Keitta and Mildred up for eviction for the week.

On Day 26, Esperanca and Seydou walked out of the house due to the former's personal issues.

This week, viewers voted for the housemate they wanted to save and these were the results:
Keitta received 8 votes to save: Angola, Ghana, Liberia, Nigeria, Sierra Leone, Tanzania, Zambia and Rest of Africa.
Eve received 7 votes to save: Botswana, Kenya, Malawi, Namibia, South Africa, Uganda and Zimbabwe.
Edith and Mildred received no votes to save.

On Day 28, Edith, Eve and Mildred were evicted while Keitta moved to the Upville House.

Week 5
On Day 29, nominations occurred in the "Upville" House. Keitta was exempted from the nominations after joining the house the previous day.On the same day, Big Brother ejected DKB and Zainab for breaking the no violence rule.

Due to this event, this week's eviction show was cancelled.

Week 6
On Day 36, Namibia and South Africa were nominated via the Random Lottery Nomination, making Jesica, Junia, Keagan and Lee up for eviction for the week.

This week, viewers voted for the housemate they wanted to save and these were the results:
Junia received 7 votes to save: Ghana, Kenya, Namibia, Nigeria, Uganda, Zambia and Zimbabwe.
Keagan received 7 votes to save: Angola, Botswana, Liberia, Malawi, Sierra Leone, South Africa and Rest of Africa.
Jesica received 1 vote to save: Tanzania.
Lee received no votes to save.

On Day 42, Jesica and Lee were evicted while Junia and Keagan moved to the Upville House.

Week 7
On Day 43, nominations occurred in the Upville House. Junia and Keagan were exempted from the nominations after joining the house the previous day.

The initial nominees were Barbz, Maneta and Prezzo.Head of House, Goldie decided to save Prezzo and replace him with Keitta.Therefore, Barbz, Keitta and Maneta were up for eviction for the week.

On Day 44, Big Brother ejected Maneta and Roki for breaking the no violence rule.This means only Barbz and Keitta were this week's nominees.

This week, viewers were voting for the housemate they wanted to save and these were the results:
Keitta received 11 votes to save: Angola, Ghana, Kenya, Liberia, Malawi, Namibia, Nigeria, Tanzania, Uganda, Zambia and Zimbabwe.
Barbz received 4 votes to save: Botswana, Sierra Leone, South Africa and Rest of Africa.

On Day 49, Barbz was evicted.

Week 8
On Day 50, Malawi and Zambia were nominated via the Random Loterry Nomination, making Nafe, Talia, Tamara and Wati up for eviction for the week.

This week, viewers voted for the housemate they wanted to save and these were the results:
Talia received 12 votes to save: Angola, Ghana, Kenya, Namibia, Nigeria, Sierra Leone, South Africa, Tanzania, Uganda, Zambia, Zimbabwe and Rest of Africa.
Wati received 3 votes to save: Botswana, Liberia and Malawi.
Nafe and Tamara received no votes to save.

On Day 56, Nafe and Tamara were evicted while Talia and Wati moved to the Upville House.On the same day, the remaining Downville housemates moved to the Upville House.

Week 9
On Day 57, nominations occurred. Talia and Wati were exempted from the nominations after joining the Upville House the previous day. All housemates were living in the Upville House after the houses merged on Day 56.

The initial nominees were Goldie, Junia, Keagan, Kyle, Lady May and Prezzo.Head of House, Keagan decided to save himself and replace himself with Malonza.Therefore, Goldie, Junia, Kyle, Lady May, Malonza and Prezzo were up for eviction for the week.

This week, viewers voted for the housemate they wanted to save and these were the results:
Lady May received 5.5 votes to save: Botswana, Liberia*, Namibia, Sierra Leone, South Africa and Zimbabwe.
Goldie received 3.5 votes to save: Ghana, Liberia*, Nigeria and Rest of Africa.
Prezzo received 2 votes to save: Kenya and Tanzania.
Kyle received 2 votes to save: Malawi and Uganda.
Junia received 1 vote to save: Angola.
Malonza received 1 vote to save: Zambia.

*Lady May and Goldie shared a vote from Liberia.

On Day 63, Junia and Malonza were evicted.

Week 10
On Day 64, nominations occurred.

The initial nominees were Goldie, Keagan, Lady May and Prezzo.Head of House, Keagan decided to save himself and replace himself with Kyle.Therefore, Goldie, Kyle, Lady May were up for eviction for the week.

This week, viewers voted for the housemate they wanted to save and these were the results:
Kyle received 6 votes to save: Ghana, Malawi, Sierra Leone, South Africa, Uganda and Zimbabwe.
Prezzo received 4 votes to save: Angola, Kenya, Liberia and Tanzania.
Lady May received 3 votes to save: Botswana, Namibia and Zimbabwe.
Goldie received 2 votes to save: Nigeria and Rest of Africa.

On Day 70, Goldie was evicted.

Week 11
On Day 71, nominations occurred.

The initial nominees were Alex, Keagan, Lady May, Prezzo and Wati.Head of House, Kyle decided to save Keagan and replace him with Keitta.Therefore, Alex, Keitta, Lady May, Prezzo and Wati were up for eviction for the week.

This week, viewers voted for the housemate they wanted to save and these were the results:
Lady May received 5 votes to save: Angola, Botswana, Namibia, Nigeria and Zimbabwe.
Prezzo received 5 votes to save: Kenya, Liberia, Tanzania, Uganda and Rest of Africa.
Wati received 3 votes to save: Malawi, South Africa and Zambia.
Keitta received 2 votes to save: Ghana and Sierra Leone.
Alex received no votes to save.

On Day 77, Alex and Keitta were evicted.

Week 12
On Day 78, nominations occurred.

The initial nominees were Janette, Lady May, Prezzo and Wati.Head of House, Wati decided to save himself and replace himself with Kyle.Therefore, Janette, Kyle, Lady May and Prezzo were up for eviction for the week.

This week, viewers voted for the housemate they wanted to save and these were the results:
Kyle received 6 voted to save: Malawi, Nigeria, Sierra Leone, South Africa, Uganda and Zambia.
Lady May received 4 votes to save: Angola, Botswana, Namibia and Zimbabwe.
Prezzo received 4 votes to save: Kenya, Liberia, Tanzania and Rest of Africa.
Janette received 1 vote to save: Ghana.

On Day 84, Janette was evicted.

Week 13
Keagan, Kyle, Lady May, Prezzo, Talia and Wati were the finalists of the season. The final six were competing for the grand prize of US$300,000.

This week, viewers voted for the housemate they wanted to win and these were the results:
Keagan won the season with 7 votes to win: Angola, Botswana, Ghana, Liberia, Nigeria, South Africa and Rest of Africa.
Prezzo became the runner-up with 2 votes to win: Kenya and Tanzania.
Lady May finished in 3rd place with 2 votes to win: Namibia and Zimbabwe.
Talia finished in 4th place with 2 votes to win: Sierra Leone and Zambia.
Kyle finished in 5th place with 1 vote to win: Uganda.
Wati finished in 6th place with 1 vote to win: Malawi.

Keagan won 2012's StarGame! season after getting the most votes with 7 country votes.

References

External links
 Big Brother Africa - Official website
 Big Brother Africa 7 at the DStv website

2012 television seasons
07